Sigma Tau was an American honor society in the field of engineering.

History
Sigma Tau was founded at the University of Nebraska on } by fourteen faculty members and students in the College of Engineering.

The officers of the Sigma Tau Fraternity at the time of the merger were:
President G. W. Forman, 
Vice President H. H. Bartel Jr., 
Secretary-Treasurer J. P. Colbert, and 
Councillors C. W. Leihy, R. P. Moser, R. E. Peterson, and J. W. Straight

Membership requirements 
Membership was chosen from the upper one-third of the Junior and Senior classes at recognized engineering schools. Selection from those men and women are made on the further basis of practicality and sociability. Approval of at least three engineering faculty is required. Distinguished members of the engineering profession may be admitted as alumni members.

Chapters

References

Defunct fraternities and sororities
Student organizations established in 1904
Engineering honor societies
Tau Beta Pi
1904 establishments in Nebraska
Former members of Association of College Honor Societies